Corbon may refer to:

Corbon, Calvados, in the Calvados département, France
Corbon, Orne, in the Orne département, France
Cor-Bon/Glaser, an American manufacturer of small arms ammunition

See also
Carbon, an element in the periodic table
Corbin (disambiguation)